The 1966 Penn Quakers football team was an American football team that represented the University of Pennsylvania during the 1966 NCAA University Division football season. Penn finished second-to-last in the Ivy League. 

In their second year under head coach Bob Odell, the Quakers compiled a 2–7 record and were outscored 237 to 176. Jerry Petrisko was the team captain.

Penn's 1–6 conference record placed seventh in the Ivy League. The Quakers were outscored 181 to 117 by Ivy opponents. 

Penn played its home games at Franklin Field adjacent to the university's campus in Philadelphia, Pennsylvania.

Schedule

References

Penn
Penn Quakers football seasons
Penn Quakers football